Frank Crane may refer to:
 Frank Hall Crane, American actor and director
 Frank Crane (politician), South Dakota politician
 Frank Crane (labor official), American civil servant, North Carolina Commissioner of Labor